Olav Boksasp (born 1958) is a Norwegian sports official.

He was the director of sports in Molde FK from the mid-1990s. From 2002 to 2006 he was the chairman of Norsk Toppfotball. In 2009 he was rumored to become a candidate for president of the Football Association of Norway, but this did not go through.

References

1949 births
Living people
People from Møre og Romsdal
Norwegian sports executives and administrators